Sir George Constantinou OBE (10 May 1930 – 16 December 2008) was a Papua New Guinean businessman and builder. Constantinou, who was born in Cyprus, immigrated to Papua New Guinea in the 1950s. He was considered to be one of Papua New Guinea's wealthiest and most successful businessmen. He lived in Papua New Guinea almost his entire life.  He had 12 children, most of whom live in Papua New Guinea, Australia and the Philippines.

Constantinou was killed after being struck on the head and other blows to his body during a failed carjacking in Gerehu, Port Moresby. The attackers were then killed by guerrilla soldiers in Moresby.

Funeral

As he had requested in his will, George Constantinou's funeral was held at the St. George Greek Orthodox Church in South Brisbane, Australia and was buried next to his mother at Mount Gravatt Cemetery on Monday 22 December 2008.

References

1933 births
2008 deaths
2008 murders in Oceania
Officers of the Order of the British Empire
Cypriot emigrants to Papua New Guinea
Papua New Guinean murder victims
People murdered in Papua New Guinea
20th-century Papua New Guinean businesspeople
Papua New Guinean people of Greek Cypriot descent
Deaths by beating
2008 in Papua New Guinea